Theodore Roosevelt Turney (April 27, 1901 – February 3, 1979) was an American football and basketball player and coach. He served as the head football coach at Heidelberg College in Tiffin, Ohio from 1940 to 1945, compiling a record of 51–56–8. Turney was the head basketball coach at Heidelberg from 1931 to 1946, tallying a mark of 92–152. He also coached track and golf at Heidelberg and retired as the school's athletic director in 1967. Turney died of a heart attack on February 3, 1979, in San Diego, California.

Head coaching record

College football

References

External links
 

1901 births
1979 deaths
American football fullbacks
American men's basketball players
Centers (basketball)
Heidelberg Student Princes athletic directors
Heidelberg Student Princes football coaches
Heidelberg Student Princes men's basketball coaches
Ohio Wesleyan Battling Bishops football players
Ohio Wesleyan Battling Bishops men's basketball players
College golf coaches in the United States
College track and field coaches in the United States
High school football coaches in Ohio
People from Union County, Ohio
Players of American football from Ohio
Basketball coaches from Ohio
Basketball players from Ohio
American football placekickers